P.S. commonly refers to:
 Postscript, writing added after the main body of a letter
PS, P.S., ps, and other variants may also refer to:

Arts and entertainment

Music
 PS Classics, a record label
 P.S. (album), a compilation album of film music by Goran Bregovic
 P.S. (A Toad Retrospective), a compilation album of music by Toad The Wet Sprocket
 "PS", 2003 song by The Books from the album The Lemon of Pink
 "P.S.", 1993 song by James from the album Laid

Other media

 PlayStation, a video gaming brand owned by Sony
PlayStation (console), a home video game console by Sony
 P.S. (film), a 2004 film
 P.S., a 2010 film by Yalkin Tuychiev
 PS Publishing, based in the UK
 Prompt corner or prompt side, an area of a stage

Language
 Pashto language (ISO 639 alpha-2 language code "ps")
 Proto Semitic, a hypothetical proto-language ancestral to historical Semitic languages of the Middle East
 The sound of the Greek letter psi (Greek) (ψ).

Places 
 Palau (FIPS PUB 10-4 territory code PS)
 State of Palestine (ISO 3166 country code PS)

Politics 
 PS – Political Science & Politics, academic journal
 Parti Socialiste (disambiguation), French
 Partido Socialista (disambiguation), Spanish and Portuguese
 Partito Socialista (disambiguation), Italian
 Polizia di Stato, Italian national police force
 Positive Slovenia
 Pradeshiya Sabha, a unit of local government in Sri Lanka
 Progressive Slovakia
 Social Democratic Party (Andorra) Partit Socialdemòcrata
 Socialist Party of Albania Partia Socialiste
 Socialist Party of Chile Partido Socialista de Chile
 Socialist Party of Romania Partidul Socialist [din România]
 Finns Party Perussuomalaiset
 Movement of Socialists (Pokret Socijalista), a political party in Serbia

Religion 
 Pastors, ministers in some Christian churches
 Psalms, a book in the Tanakh and Christian Bibles

Science and technology

Units of measurement 
 Petasecond (Ps), 1015 seconds
 Picosecond (ps), 10−12 seconds
 Pferdestärke (PS), abbreviation of the German term for metric horsepower
 Picosiemens (pS), SI unit of electric conductance

Computing 
 Adobe Photoshop, a graphics editor and creator by Adobe
 MPEG program stream, an MPEG-2 container format
 Parametric Stereo, feature used in digital audio
 PostScript, a page description language
 .ps, filename extension for a file in PostScript format
 ps (Unix), an application that displays statistics on running processes
 .ps, the State of Palestine Internet domain extension or top-level domain (ccTLD)
 PS Power and Sample Size, an interactive computer program for power and sample size calculations
 Windows PowerShell, a command line scripting and system management shell for Microsoft Windows

Medicine 
 Panayiotopoulos syndrome, a childhood seizure disorder
 Progeroid syndromes, a group of rare diseases causing premature aging
 Pulmonary stenosis or pulmonic stenosis, obstruction of the pulmonary artery of the heart

Physics and chemistry 
 P or static pressure, in fluid mechanics and aviation
 Proton Synchrotron, a 1959 particle accelerator at CERN
 Chloropicrin, a highly toxic chemical compound
 Phosphatidylserine, a phospholipid
 Phosphorothioate (or thiophosphate), a family of compounds and anions with the general chemical formula PS4−xOx3− (x = 0, 1, 2, or 3)
 Polystyrene, a common type of plastic
 Ps, positronium, pseudo-chemical symbol

Transportation 
 Paddle steamer, abbreviated PS in vessel prefixes
 Pacific Southwest Airlines (1949-1988), IATA designator of former airline
 Ukraine International Airlines, IATA airline designator since 1992

Other uses
 iPhrothiya yeSiliva, a South African military award
 MoMA PS1, an art institution in New York
 Padma Shri, an Indian civilian award
 Plastic Surgery, abbreviated as P.S. for simple use
 Police sergeant
 Power Stage, a World Rally Championship special stage
 Power Steering, a device that helps with steering vehicles
 Power supply
 Professional services, abbreviated P.S. in name suffixes
 State school or public school, in the USA and other countries

See also 
 P.S. I Love You (disambiguation)
 PSS (disambiguation)